William Koech (born December 2, 1961) is a retired Kenyan long-distance runner who specialized in the 10,000 metres.

In 1991 he won a silver medal in the 10,000 metres at the All-Africa Games held in Cairo. He finished seventh in the same distance at the 1992 Summer Olympics after winning in his semi-final.

Achievements

External links

1961 births
Living people
Kenyan male long-distance runners
Athletes (track and field) at the 1992 Summer Olympics
Olympic athletes of Kenya
African Games silver medalists for Kenya
African Games medalists in athletics (track and field)
Kenyan male cross country runners
Athletes (track and field) at the 1991 All-Africa Games